"I Wanna Sex You Up" is a song by American R&B group Color Me Badd, released in March 1991 as the lead single from their debut album, C.M.B. (1991). The song was produced by Dr. Freeze and was also featured on the soundtrack to the 1991 film New Jack City, starring Wesley Snipes, Ice-T, Chris Rock and Judd Nelson. The single achieved commercial success in the United States, spending four weeks at number two on the Billboard Hot 100, and topping both the Billboard Hot R&B Singles chart and the Billboard Hot Dance Singles Sales chart. "I Wanna Sex You Up" also enjoyed international success, peaking atop the charts of New Zealand and the United Kingdom.

Chart performance
The song spent three weeks at number one on the UK Singles Chart and reached number two for four consecutive weeks on the US Billboard Hot 100. It was the 10th-best-selling single of 1991 in the UK and the Number 2 song of the year in the US, and in 1992 the song won the group a Soul Train Music Award for Best R&B/Soul Single, Group, Band or Duo and Soul Train Music Award for Best R&B/Soul Song of the Year.

Critical reception
A reviewer from Cashbox described the song as "naughty and suggestive yet not particularly explicit R&B/pop". Arion Berger from Entertainment Weekly complimented it as "irresistible". Dennis Hunt from Los Angeles Times found that all it "has going for it is sexy lyrics." James Hamilton from Music Weeks RM Dance Update called it a "sweetly cooing young guys crooned gorgeous sineous sexy swayer". Stephen Holden from New York Times wrote, "'I Wanna Sex You Up' has a loping pop Latin beat that is similar to the Young Rascals' 'Groovin'' and Laura Nyro's 'Stoned Soul Picnic', and a piercing lead vocal by Bryan Abrams, whose voice resembles that of the late-1960's Stevie Wonder." David Fricke from Rolling Stone declared it as "a crafty blend of doo-wop doo-wah and hip-hop clatter so irresistible it makes you willing to forgive the utter banality of the lyrics." Mark Frith from Smash Hits felt that Color Me Badd "sound excellent" when "they do manage to break into a sweat", like on "I Wanna Sex You Up".

Retrospective response
Alex Henderson from AllMusic named the song as one of the "moments" on the C.M.B. album, describing it as a slow jam which samples rapper Slick Rick "in a rather clever fashion". "I Wanna Sex You Up" was ranked number 40 on Blender's list of the "50 Worst Songs Ever" and VH1's "100 Greatest Songs of the '90s". In an 2017 retrospective review, Pop Rescue commented, "This song stood out from the rest of the charts when it was released in the UK, and that along with the boys’ breathy sexy promises and the inclusion of ‘sex’ in the song title made this track a sure-fire hit. Musically it's quite a simple song, allowing the vocals to really shine here – and to their credit, their vocals worth together really well."

Track listings

 7" single "I Wanna Sex You Up" (master mix) — 4:05
 "I Wanna Sex You Up" (smoothed out mix) — 3:38

 12" maxi "I Wanna Sex You Up" (smoothed out mix) — 3:38
 "I Wanna Sex You Up" (smoothed out - long version) — 5:13
 "I Wanna Sex You Up" (instrumental) — 4:04
 "I Wanna Sex You Up" (master mix) — 4:05
 "I Wanna Sex You Up" (freeze mix) — 4:06

 CD single"I Wanna Sex You Up" (master mix) — 4:06
"I Wanna Sex You Up" (smoothed out mix / long version) — 5:13
"I Wanna Sex You Up" (freeze Mix) — 4:07
"I Wanna Sex You Up" (instrumental) — 4:04

 CD maxi "I Wanna Sex You Up" (smoothed out mix) — 3:39
 "I Wanna Sex You Up" (smoothed out mix - long version) — 5:14
 "I Wanna Sex You Up" (Instrumental) — 4:04
 "I Wanna Sex You Up" (master mix) — 4:05
 "I Wanna Sex You Up" (freeze mix) — 4:07

 Cassette'
 "I Wanna Sex You Up" (master mix)
 "I Wanna Sex You Up" (smoothed out mix)
 "I Wanna Sex You Up" (master mix)
 "I Wanna Sex You Up" (smoothed out mix)

Personnel
 Co-producer : Howie Tee, Spyderman
 Engineer : Angela Piva, Warren Woods
 Mastered by Eddy Schreyer
 Mixed by Dr. Freeze, Howie Tee
 Producer : Dr. Freeze

Charts

Weekly charts

Year-end charts

Certifications

Covers, remixes and samples
A sample of "I Wanna Sex You Up" was used in the Kardinal Beats remix of "Tick Tock" by Lemar.

See also
 R&B number-one hits of 1991 (USA)
 List of number-one singles from the 1990s (UK)
 List of number-one singles in 1991 (NZ)

References

External links
 Whosampled

1991 debut singles
1991 songs
Color Me Badd songs
Giant Records (Warner) singles
Music Week number-one dance singles
New jack swing songs
Number-one singles in New Zealand
Song recordings produced by Dr. Freeze
Songs written by Dr. Freeze
UK Singles Chart number-one singles